Soravilla is a surname. Notable people with the surname include:

Lesbia Soravilla (1906–1989), Cuban writer, feminist and activist 
Sabrina Soravilla (born 1996), Uruguayan footballer